Frances Raymond (1869–1961) was an American stage and film actress. An established character actress, she played in a number of supporting roles during the silent era. Later, during the sound era, she primarily played much smaller, uncredited parts.

Raymond was the daughter of Frederick Lapzieu of Brooklyn.

Career

Raymond's acting career ended in 1894. She acted with the Frohman road companies and had been performing in The Girl I Left Behind Me in Memphis when she and the management parted ways. Management of Charles Frohman's company said that she had been incompetent, while she said that she angered a company official by resisting his advances.

Turning from acting to writing, Raymond spent almost three years working on a novel, Maylou, which the G. W. Dillingham Company published in 1897. Critics attacked the book's plot and style, compounding its lack of success while creating "a sort of ephemeral notoriety" for it. That lack of success led to her becoming "melancholy and morose".

Personal life 
In 1892, Raymond married businessman Franklin Raymond Wallace, Some time later "she discovered that Wallace was a married man with a daughter nearly as old as herself." He settled a lawsuit that she had filed by promising to pay her $100 per month. By 1896, she said that he had stopped those payments. Therefore, she sued him for $50,000. Later, Raymond felt deserted by a young doctor whom she had "loved deeply" after he had paid "marked attention" to her for two years before telling her that he intended to marry someone else.

Death
On June 23, 1901, Raymond died of asphyxiation in her New York apartment. She committed suicide by inhaling gas in her New York City apartment after she had closed off the keyhole and the space under the door and removed three of the chandelier's four gas burners.

Selected filmography

 The Strange Case of Mary Page (1916)
 The Misleading Lady (1916)
 Skinner's Dress Suit (1917)
 Burning the Candle (1917)
 Sadie Goes to Heaven (1917)
 Love Insurance (1919)
 The Other Half (1919)
 Miss Hobbs (1920)
 A Light Woman (1920)
 The Best of Luck (1920)
 Smoldering Embers (1920)
 A Lady in Love (1920)
 The Midlanders (1920)
 The City of Masks (1920)
 Li Ting Lang (1920)
 The March Hare (1921)
 One a Minute (1921)
 Garments of Truth (1921)
 Two Weeks with Pay (1921)
One Wild Week (1921)
 Hurricane's Gal (1922)
 Shadows (1922)
 The Ghost Breaker (1922)
 A Chapter in Her Life (1923)
 The Grail (1923)
 Money, Money, Money (1923)
 The Meanest Man in the World (1923)
 Flirting with Love (1924)
 Girls Men Forget (1924)
 Abraham Lincoln (1924)
 Excitement (1924)
 California Straight Ahead (1925)
 Scandal Proof (1925)
 Satan in Sables (1925)
 Seven Chances (1925)
 The Girl on the Stairs (1925)
 What Happened to Jones (1926)
 Behind the Front (1926)
 Stage Kisses (1927)
 The Cruel Truth (1927)
 Get Your Man (1927)
 The Wreck (1927)
 Rich Men's Sons (1927)
 The Gay Defender (1927)
 Web of Fate (1927)
 The Gay Old Bird (1927)
 Wandering Girls (1927)
 Illusion (1929)
 Everything's Rosie (1931)
 Morning Glory (1933)
 The Mighty Barnum (1934)
 College Scandal (1935)
 Champagne Waltz (1937)
 You Can't Take It with You (1938)
 The Star Maker (1939)
 The Great Victor Herbert (1939)
 Cafe Society (1939)
 West Point Widow (1941)
 The Lady Eve (1941)
 Life with Henry (1941)
 Happy Go Lucky (1943)
 You Came Along (1945)
 Our Hearts Were Growing Up (1946)
 Ladies' Man (1947)

References

External links

Bibliography
 Goble, Alan. The Complete Index to Literary Sources in Film. Walter de Gruyter, 1999.

1869 births
1961 deaths
American film actresses
American stage actresses
American silent film actresses
20th-century American actresses
People from Salem, Massachusetts